Season one of the television program American Experience originally aired on the PBS network in the United States on October 4, 1988 and concluded on January 17, 1989. The season contained 16 new episodes and began with the film The Great San Francisco Earthquake. This is the first season to feature David McCullough as the host, who previously hosted the PBS show Smithsonian World from 1984 to 1988.

Episodes

Notes

References

1988 American television seasons
1989 American television seasons
American Experience